Rear Admiral William Onahan Gallery (22 June 1904 – 15 November 1981) was a United States Navy admiral — one of three brothers who became United States Navy admirals.  A graduate of the United States Naval Academy, he was a naval aviator who served with distinction in combat during World War II.

Biography
William Onahan Gallery was born on 22 June 1904 in Chicago, Illinois. He was the son of Daniel Vincent Gallery (born Chicago, July 19, 1865), lawyer, and Mary Onahan Gallery, writer. Gallery entered the United States Naval Academy in 1921, the second of three brothers who would graduate from the Naval Academy.

He received his commission as a United States Navy ensign in 1925.  He served aboard the battleship  from 1925 to 1927, followed by duty aboard  from 1927 to 1930.

In 1930, Gallery reported for flight training in Pensacola, Florida. After nine months of training, he was awarded his wings as a naval aviator and assigned to Patrol Squadron 6 until 1933.

From 1935 to 1937, he served at the Aeronautical Engineering Laboratory in Washington, D.C. Then from 1937 to 1939, he served in Fighter Squadron 6 (VF-6) on the aircraft carrier .  His last assignment before World War II was at the Naval Air Station Alameda, Alameda, California.

In 1941, at the start of World War II, Gallery served on the staff of  Admiral Thomas C. Kinkaid where he participated in the Battle of Santa Cruz; and then was based at Guadalcanal where he served in combat with the First Escort Carrier Task Group.

He was awarded the Distinguished Flying Cross for his method of destroying Japanese night raiders.

In Eight Bells and All's Well, his brother Daniel V. Gallery noted that Phil broke Princeton out of mothballs and had her launching airstrikes off Korea in less than 60 days, a speed record for reactivating an aircraft carrier.

Rear Admiral William Gallery retired from the United States Navy in June 1955.  He died in 1981 and was buried at Arlington National Cemetery with full military honors.

 is named in honor of the three Gallery admirals — William, Phillip, and Daniel.

See also
William O. Gallery's brothers who were also Navy Rear Admirals:
Phillip D. Gallery
Daniel V. Gallery

Notes

References

1904 births
1931 deaths
United States Navy personnel of World War II
Burials at Arlington National Cemetery
United States Naval Aviators
Military personnel from Chicago
Recipients of the Legion of Merit
Recipients of the Distinguished Flying Cross (United States)
United States Naval Academy alumni
United States Navy rear admirals